The Lady in White (Italian: La dama bianca) is a 1938 Italian "white-telephones" comedy film directed by Mario Mattoli and starring Elsa Merlini, Nino Besozzi and Enrico Viarisio. The film's sets were designed by the art director Piero Filippone. It was shot at the Farnesina Studios of Titanus in Rome.

Cast
 Elsa Merlini as Marina Gualandi
 Nino Besozzi as Giulio Gualandi
 Enrico Viarisio as Savelli
 Vincenzo Scarpetta as Virgilio Ottolano
 Arnaldo Martelli as Francesco
 Paolo Stoppa as Il direttore dell'hotel a Cervinia
 Ada Cristina Almirante as Isabella Schetti Marazzani
 Giuliana Gianni as Ginevra
 Ivana Claar as Corinna
 Aristide Baghetti as Il medico
 Fanny Marchio as La signora al vagone ristorante 
 Giovanna Galletti as Un'amica di Ginevra
 Lisl Ander as Gianna
 Checco Rissone as L'autista del pullman a Cervinia
 Alba Ferrarotti as Gina
 Franca Volpini as Una cameriera

References

Bibliography
 Clarke, David B. & Doel, Marcus A. Moving Pictures/Stopping Places: Hotels and Motels on Film. Lexington Books, 2009.

External links

1938 films
1938 comedy films
Italian comedy films
1930s Italian-language films
Italian black-and-white films
Films set in the 1920s
Films set in Italy
Films directed by Mario Mattoli
1930s Italian films